LIPID MAPS (Lipid Metabolites and Pathways Strategy) is a web portal designed to be a gateway to Lipidomics resources. The resource has spearheaded a classification of biological lipids, dividing them into eight general categories. LIPID MAPS provides standardised methodologies for mass spectrometry analysis of lipids, e.g. 

LIPID MAPS has been cited as evidence of a growing appreciation of the study of lipid metabolism and the rapid development and standardisation of the lipidomics field 

Key LIPID MAPS resources include:
 LIPID MAPS Structure Database (LMSD) - a database of structures and annotations of biologically relevant lipids, containing over 46000 different lipids. The paper describing this resource has, according to PubMed, been cited more than 200 times.
 LIPID MAPS In-Silico Structure Database (LMISSD) - a database of computationally predicted lipids generated by expansion of headgroups for commonly occurring lipid classes
 LIPID MAPS Gene/Proteome Database (LMPD) - a database of genes and gene products which are involved in lipid metabolism

Tools available from LIPID MAPS enable scientists to identify likely lipids in their samples from mass spectrometry data, a common method to analyse lipids in biological specimens. In particular, LipidFinder  enables analysis of MS data. Tutorials and educational material on lipids are also available at the site.

In January 2020, LIPID MAPS became an ELIXIR service.

History
LIPID MAPS was founded in 2003 with NIH funding. Since 2016, it has been a joint project between the University of Cardiff led by Prof Valerie O'Donnell, the Babraham Institute under Michael Wakelam, and UCSD scientists Shankar Subramaniam and Ed Dennis funded by the Wellcome Trust. Wakelam's obituary describes LIPID MAPS as unifying the field of lipidomics.

LIPID MAPS is sponsored by Avanti Polar lipids and Cayman Chemicals

References

Biological databases
Lipids